Elections to Chorley Borough Council were held on 6 May 2010.  One third of the council was up for election and the Conservative party held overall control.

After the election, the composition of the council was:

Election result

Results Map

Ward results

Adlington and Anderton ward

Astley and Buckshaw ward

Chisnall ward

Chorley East ward

Chorley North East ward

Chorley North West ward

Chorley South East ward

Chorley South West ward

Clayton le Woods and Whittle le Woods ward

Clayton le Woods North ward

Clayton le Woods West and Cuerden ward

Coppull ward

Eccleston and Mawdesley ward

Euxton North ward

Euxton South ward

Pennine ward

Wheelton and Withnell ward

References
 Candidates list from Chorley Borough Council

2010
2010 English local elections
May 2010 events in the United Kingdom
2010s in Lancashire